Marion Liddell Fyfe (1 September 1897 – 26 August 1986) was a New Zealand academic, specialising in taxonomy of planarians and other flatworms, the first woman zoology lecturer at the University of Otago, and the first woman to be elected to the Council of the Royal Society Te Apārangi.

Academic career 
Fyfe was born in Kakanui in Otago on 1 September 1897 to parents Harriet and William Fyfe.

Fyfe graduated with an MSc in zoology in 1935 from the University of Otago. She became the first female zoology lecturer at Otago in 1921, and was acting head of the department on occasion. Her research focussed on flatworms and particularly their reproductive processes.

In 1949, Fyfe became the first woman to be elected to the Council of the Royal Society Te Apārangi. She helped first with editing of proofs for the Transactions of the Royal Society of New Zealand journal, and later became editor. She is credited with improving the quality of the journal.

Fyfe retired from the University of Otago in 1957.

Elizabeth Edgar, Fyfe's niece, was "one of New Zealand's most esteemed botanists".

Fyfe died on the 26 August 1986.

Awards and honours 
The genus of planarians Marionfyfea was named in her honour, for "her pioneering taxonomic anatomical work on the Terricola of New Zealand".

The Marion Fyfe Scholarship (worth $500) is awarded annually by the Department of Zoology at the University of Otago to the "female zoology student who attained the highest level of achievement in Zoology at 400-level".

In 2017 Fyfe was selected as one of the Royal Society Te Apārangi's 150 women in 150 words, celebrating the contributions of women to knowledge in New Zealand.

Selected works

References 

1897 births
1986 deaths
People from Otago
University of Otago alumni
Academic staff of the University of Otago
New Zealand zoologists
New Zealand women scientists
New Zealand women academics